The 2003 Green Flag MSA British Touring Car Championship season was the 46th British Touring Car Championship (BTCC) season.

Changes for 2003

Team and driver changes - Touring
For 2003 all three main manufacturers in the premier Touring class ran three cars.  Reigning champions Vauxhall cut down to three Astra Coupes by axing its Egg Sport squad and entering three VX Racing-liveried cars, run once again by Triple 8.  2002 champion James Thompson and runner-up Yvan Muller remained, and Paul O'Neill moved across from Egg Sport to take the third seat.

MG expanded to three West Surrey Racing-run ZSs, with Colin Turkington joining 2002 drivers Anthony Reid and Warren Hughes after impressing in his debut season with the Team Atomic Kitten MG squad, which had also been run by WSR.

Arena Motorsport ran three Civic Type Rs for Honda, with only Irishman Alan Morrison remaining from the 2002 line-up. Matt Neal replaced Andy Priaulx (who left to contest the European Touring Car Championship with BMW) after moving from Vauxhall, and teenager Tom Chilton filled the third seat after an impressive debut year in the Barwell Motorsport-run Astra.  Proton again returned as a fourth manufacturer, retaining both David Leslie and Phil Bennett in its two Impians.

Vic Lee Racing switched from the ex-works Peugeot 406 Coupe's to a pair of brand new  Peugeot 307 designed by Sergio Rinland, former chief designer at the Sauber Formula 1 team. Reigning independents cup champion Dan Eaves was retained alongside Carl Breeze who raced for the team for most of 2002. Meanwhile, Tim Harvey swapped his crash helmet for a microphone, joining ITV's commentary team. Breeze would leave the team after the Rockingham races, moving to GA Motorsport in the seat vacated by Gavin Pyper. Daniel Buxton would in turn take Breeze's seat at VLR, graduating from the Clio Cup which he had been dominating at the time.

Gavin Pyper had started the season strongly in the GA Motorsport Vauxhall Astra Coupe, winning the independents class five times in the ten races he contested and leading the class when he was forced to withdraw due to a lack of funding.  With Breeze now in Pyper's car Paul Wallace switched from GA's production Alfa Romeo to a second Astra which the team had entered for Gareth Howell at Silverstone.

Howell himself later reappeared in another ex-Triple 8 Astra for Team Dynamics from the Snetterton rounds onwards.

Production class champions Synchro Motorsport graduated to the touring class with champion driver James Kaye running an ex-works Honda Civic Type R.

Also stepping up was Rob Collard with his self-run team, entering an ex-works Vauxhall Astra Coupe that had been driven by Aaron Slight in 2002.

Team and driver changes - Production 
Barwell Motorsport headed the Production class field after stepping back down from the Touring class and acquiring Synchro Motorsport's title winning Honda Civic Type Rs, which were driven by young debutante Luke Hines, and Alan Blencowe, moving from GA Motorsports.  Edenbridge Racing cut down to a single BMW 320i for single seater convert Michael Bentwood, with Tom Boardman switching to John Batchelor's team (now known as Team Varta) in a new Peugeot 307. Jim Edwards Jnr returned in a Honda Accord as the team's second driver.  A Peugeot 306 GTi and a second 307 joined the Varta line-up midway through the season together with Jay Wheals and Richard Marsh, and each of the four drivers raced more than one of these chassis across the remainder of the year.

GA Motorsport campaigned Alfa Romeo 156s for a fourth year, with Chris Ryan and Paul Wallace driving.  However, Ryan withdrew after an expensive crash in the second round at Brands Hatch, and Wallace was called up to the team's Touring class assault mid-season.  Mark Fullalove joined the grid mid-season with his own team, driving the Peugeot 306 he had raced for Tech-Speed Motorsport in 2002, while Jason Hughes was another late entry in a Nissan Primera run by his own Kartworld Racing team.

Other changes
 Dunlop were confirmed as the sole tyre supplier, replacing BF Goodrich
 The series included a race meeting at Rockingham for the first time, replacing Knockhill
 Qualifying sessions at each race meeting lasted 20 minutes (compared to the 43 minutes of 2002) and only determined the starting grid for the first race
 The finishing positions of race 1 determined the grid for race 2
 Mandatory pit-stops were introduced for all Touring class cars in both races
 Alan Gow returned as series administrator midway through the season, replacing Richard West who became the championship's commercial manager.
 In addition to the ITV coverage MotorsTV broadcast all races live.

Teams and drivers

Race calendar and winners

Championship results

No driver may collect more than one "Lead a Lap" point per race no matter how many laps they lead.
Race 1 polesitter receives 1 point.

Drivers' Championships

Note: bold signifies pole position in class (1 point awarded in first race only), italics signifies fastest lap in class (1 point awarded all races) and * signifies at least one lap in the lead (1 point given all races).

Independents' Cup

Manufacturers Championship

Touring Teams Championship

Production Teams Championship

References

External links

2003 Season
Touring Car Championship season